Statistics of Czechoslovak First League in the 1927 season. Antonín Puč was the league's top scorers with 13 goals.

Overview
It was contested by 9 teams, and Sparta Prague won the championship.

League standings

Results

Top goalscorers

References

Czechoslovakia - List of final tables (RSSSF)

Czechoslovak First League seasons
1
Czech